Jovana Mrkić (born 3 March 1994) is a Montenegrin football defender currently playing for ŽFK Ekonomist.

External links 
 

1994 births
Living people
Montenegrin women's footballers
Women's association football defenders
Montenegro women's international footballers
ŽFK Ekonomist players